Machaerina rubiginosa, commonly known as soft twig rush, flat leaf twig rush or common twig rush, is a flowering plant in the sedge family, Cyperaceae, that is native to Asia and the Pacific.

Description
It blooms between August and March producing brown flowers. It has rigid, terete and biconvex culms that are smooth and glabrous. After flowering an ellipsoid to obovoid shaped pale red-brown to bright orange coloured nut.

Distribution and habitat
It found in swamps and on the margins of lakes and streams along coastal areas in the Mid West, Wheatbelt, Peel, South West, Great Southern and Goldfields-Esperance regions where it grows in damp silty-sandy soils. It is also found in Queensland, Victoria, New South Wales, South Australia, Tasmania and the Northern Territory.

The upright foliage and spreading rhizomatous habit allow the plant to form large dense swards in wet areas. The plant tends to grow taller in permanently damp areas and shorter in ephemeral environments. It is suitable for use in artificial wetlands.

References

rubiginosa
Flora of Western Australia